Pacific is a 1978 album featuring instrumental compositions by Japanese musicians Haruomi Hosono, Shigeru Suzuki and Tatsuro Yamashita.

Critical reception 
Jen Monroe of Listen to This called the album "a classic," stating "its unabashed tropical nostalgia acts as a jumping off point for flitting between genres (lounge, funk, disco, rhumba, smooth jazz, Latin fusion, synth pop), all delivered in full-color with jaunty, winking songwriting."

Track listing

Personnel 

 Haruomi Hosono, Shigeru Suzuki, Tatsuro Yamashita – Music 
 Tsuguya Inoue (井上嗣也) – Designer
 Shinichi Hashimoto (橋本伸一) – Director
 Yuichi Maejima (前島祐一) – Engineer 
 "Teppei" Kasai (笠井“鉄平”) – Associate Engineer
 Shinpei Asai (浅井慎平) – Photographer
 Masatoshi Sakai (酒井政利) – Producer

References 

1978 albums
Haruomi Hosono albums
Shigeru Suzuki albums
Tatsuro Yamashita albums